Robert de Ferrers or Robert Ferrers may refer to:

Robert de Ferrers, 1st Earl of Derby (c. 1062–1139)
Robert de Ferrers, 2nd Earl of Derby (died 1162)
Robert de Ferrers, 6th Earl of Derby (1239–1279)
Robert de Ferrers, 3rd Baron Ferrers of Chartley (1309–1350)
Robert de Ferrers, 5th Baron Ferrers of Chartley (ca. 1358 – 1413)
Robert Farrar (MP), 16th-century politician

See also